The Diocesan Museum of Amalfi (Museo Diocesano di Amalfi) is an art museum housed in the 9th century Basilica del Crocifisso di Amalfi (Basilica of the Crucifix) in Amalfi. It displays many of the treasures of the Roman Catholic Archdiocese of Amalfi-Cava de' Tirreni and is centrally located close to Amalfi Cathedral in Via Salita Episcopio.

History 
The Museum is housed in the Basilica of the Crucifix – originally the Cathedral Church – whose origin dates back to the year 596. In 1100, the new cathedral was built next to it and together formed a single church of Romanesque style with six aisles. Later, in the Baroque period, they were covered with marble and stucco and restored as two separate and distinct churches. The restoration of the Basilica of the Crucifix, which was completed in 1994, eliminated the Baroque style, bringing out a very considerable portion of the medieval structure with the gallery of single and double windows that filter and distribute a magnificent light. The museum opened in 1996.

Organisation 
The museum's itinerary is developed in four sections:
 The Cloister (built between the 1266 and 1268);
 The Wall paintings (mural paintings and frescoes, dating from the 13th century to the 14th century);
 The Cathedral Treasury (precious liturgical objects and sacred paraments, belonging to the Treasure of the Cathedral);
 The Paintings and sculptures (preserves valuable paintings and sculptures).

Gallery

References

Bibliography 
 Erminia Giacomini Miari, Paola Mariani, Musei religiosi in Italia, Editore Touring, Milano 2005, p. 41 
 Stefano Zuffi, I Musei Diocesani in Italia, vol. 3, Editore San Paolo, Palazzolo sull'Oglio (BS) 2003, pp. 34 – 41

External links 
 Official Diocese Museum Web Site,  Pagina sul Museo nel sito della Diocesi
 Tourism Pastoral Official Web Site, Pagina sul Museo nel sito dell'Ufficio per la Pastorale del Turismo della Diocesi
 Official Catholic Church Museums Web Site, Museo nel sito ufficiale della Chiesa Cattolica - Anagrafe degli Istituti Culturali Ecclesiastici
 Regional Museums, Scheda nel sito dei Musei della Regione

Religious museums in Italy
Art museums and galleries in Campania
Buildings and structures in Amalfi